The lowland paca (Cuniculus paca), also known as the spotted paca, is a large rodent found in tropical and sub-tropical America, from east-central Mexico to northern Argentina, and has been introduced to Cuba and Algeria.

The animal is called paca in most of its range, but tepezcuintle  (original Aztec language name) in most of Mexico and Central America, tepesquintle in Guatemala, 'guardatinaja in Nicaragua, pisquinte in northern Costa Rica,  in the Yucatán peninsula, conejo pintado in Panama, guanta in Ecuador,  majás or picuro in Peru, jochi pintado in Bolivia, and boruga, tinajo, or guartinaja in Colombia. It is also known as the gibnut in Belize, where it is prized as a game animal, labba in Guyana, lapa in Venezuela, and lappe on the island of Trinidad. Although lowland pacas are not in danger of being extinct, local extinctions have occurred due to habitat destructions.

There is much confusion in the nomenclature of this and related species; see agouti. In particular, the popular term agouti or common agouti normally refers to species of the distinct  genus Dasyprocta (such as the Central American agouti, Dasyprocta punctata). Sometimes the word agouti is also used for a polyphyletic grouping uniting the families Cuniculidae and Dasyproctidae, which, besides the pacas and common agoutis, includes also the acouchis (Myoprocta). Cuniculus is the appropriate genus name instead of Agouti'' based on a 1998 ruling of the International Commission on Zoological Nomenclature as the lowland paca's genus.

Etymology 
The word  comes from a word in the Tupi language that designates the animal but also means 'awaken, alert'.

Description 

The lowland paca has coarse fur without underfur, dark brown to black on the upper body and white or yellowish on the underbelly. It usually has three to five rows of white spots along its sides, against a dark grey background. It has thick strong legs, with four digits in the forefeet and five in the hind feet (the first and fifth are reduced); the nails function as hooves. The tail is short and hairless. The zygomatic arch is expanded laterally and dorsally and is used as a resonating chamber - a unique feature among mammals.

Each litter has one young lowland paca, sometimes two. They usually have one to three young a year with a gestation period of about 115–120 days. Pacas are sexually mature at about 1 year. A paca usually lives up to 13 years.

The lowland paca can carry leishmaniasis and trypanosomiasis.

Habits 

The lowland paca is mostly nocturnal and solitary and does not vocalize very much. It lives in forested habitats near water, preferably smaller rivers, and dig simple burrows about 2 m (6 ft 7 in) below the surface, usually with more than one exit. It can also sometimes live in burrows created by other animals. The lowland paca is a good swimmer and usually heads for the water to escape danger, as it can stay under water for several minutes. It also is a very good climber and it searches for fruit in the trees.

The lowland paca can be considered an important seed distributor, since its diet includes leaves, stems, roots, tubers, nuts, seeds, herbs and fruit, especially avocados, mangos and zapotes, as well as coco macaque, balata, wild chataigne, hog plum, pomerac and guava. Introduced species such as jack-fruit and buri are also eaten. It sometimes stores food.

Economical and ecological aspects 
The lowland paca is considered an agricultural pest for yam, cassava, sugar cane, maize and other food crops. Its meat is highly prized. It is plentiful in protected habitats, and hence not in danger of extinction, but overall its numbers have been much reduced because of hunting and habitat destruction. It is easily bred and raised in farms, although the taste is said to be inferior (perhaps unpleasant) when farmed. Some of the lowland paca predators include cats, jaguars, coyotes, bush dogs, crocodiles, and boa constrictors.

See also 

 Agouti
 Mountain paca

References

External links 

ITIS database
Animal Diversity Web
 Convenio Andrés Bello, archived
Zoochat image

Cuniculus (genus)
Hystricognath rodents
Mammals of Argentina
Rodents of Central America
Mammals of Bolivia
Mammals of Brazil
Mammals of Colombia
Mammals of Cuba
Mammals of Ecuador
Mammals of French Guiana
Mammals of Guyana
Mammals of Mexico
Mammals of Paraguay
Mammals of Peru
Mammals of Suriname
Mammals of Uruguay
Mammals of Venezuela
Mammals of Trinidad and Tobago
Mammals of the Caribbean
Mammals described in 1766
Taxa named by Carl Linnaeus